Fossmoen is a small village in Målselv Municipality in Troms og Finnmark county, Norway. The village is named after the nearby Bardufossen waterfall. The population of Fossmoen (2001) was 147.

The local Fossmotunet folklore museum, which is a part of the Midt-Troms Museum is located here. It is built as a farm from the 19th century, using original buildings from Målselv. The museum is open to visitors only in the summer season.

References

External links
 Midt-Troms Museum 

Målselv
Villages in Troms
Populated places of Arctic Norway